This is a list of the players who are on the rosters of the given teams who are participating in the 2008 Beijing Olympics for Women's Basketball.

Group A

The following is the Australia roster in the women's basketball tournament of the 2008 Summer Olympics.

The following is the Belarus roster in the women's basketball tournament of the 2008 Summer Olympics.

The following is the Brazil roster in the women's basketball tournament of the 2008 Summer Olympics.

The following is the South Korea roster in the women's basketball tournament of the 2008 Summer Olympics.

The following is the Latvia roster in the women's basketball tournament of the 2008 Summer Olympics.

The following is the Russia roster in the women's basketball tournament of the 2008 Summer Olympics.

Group B

The following is the China roster in the women's basketball tournament of the 2008 Summer Olympics.

The following is the Czech Republic roster in the women's basketball tournament of the 2008 Summer Olympics.

The following is the Mali roster in the women's basketball tournament of the 2008 Summer Olympics.

The following is the New Zealand roster in the women's basketball tournament of the 2008 Summer Olympics.

The following is the Spain roster in the women's basketball tournament of the 2008 Summer Olympics.

The following is the United States roster in the women's basketball tournament of the 2008 Summer Olympics.

See also
Wheelchair basketball at the 2008 Summer Paralympics – Rosters

References

Rosters
2008